Sir Bevil Granville (3 May 1665 – 15 September 1706) was an English soldier and politician from Cornwall, who was MP for Fowey and Lostwithiel from 1690 to 1698. He also served as Governor of Pendennis Castle from 1693 to 1703 and Governor of Barbados from 1703 to 1706, and died at sea on his return voyage to England in September 1706.

Personal details
Bevil Granville was born in London and baptised on 3 May 1665 at St Martin-in-the-Fields, eldest son of Bernard Granville (1631–1701) and his wife Anne Morley (died 1701). His grandfather was the Royalist hero Sir Bevil Grenville (1596–1643) who died at the Battle of Lansdowne, while his father was Groom of the Chamber to Charles II and MP for various constituencies from 1661 to 1698.

He had two brothers, George (1666–1735), Secretary at War in the 1710 to 1712 Tory government, and Bernard (1670–1723); both were suspected of Jacobitism after  George I became king in 1714 and lost office as a result. Bevil never married and left his entire estate to his brother George.

Career

After graduating from Trinity College, Cambridge in 1679, he spent several years in Paris, before returning to England. In June 1685, he was commissioned as captain in a regiment raised by his uncle, the Earl of Bath, part of an expansion of the military by James II following the Monmouth Rebellion.

Knighted by James in 1686, he was promoted major in 1687 and in August 1688 his regiment was sent to garrison Plymouth, a key strategic port in the West Country. His uncle, who was Governor of the town, defected to William of Orange after his landing at Torbay during the November 1688 Glorious Revolution, while Granville was sent to secure Jersey.

In March 1690, he was elected MP for Lostwithiel, a borough controlled by his uncle, although he spent little time in the House of Commons. By now a lieutenant colonel, his regiment was transferred to Ostend at the end of 1691 to serve in the Nine Years War and suffered heavy casualties at Steenkerque in August 1692. He replaced the Earl of Bath as colonel of the regiment in October 1693,  and returned to England in December, having transferred operational command to Sidney Godolphin. 

During the Siege of Namur in June 1695, he fought a duel with the Marquis de Rade, a French Huguenot exile and Colonel of the 6th Foot, who died of wounds shortly afterwards. In November 1695, he was elected MP for Fowey, another borough controlled by the Earl of Bath. His regiment returned to England in early 1696 due to fears of a Jacobite invasion, and in a demonstration of his perceived reliability, on 21 March he was appointed Governor of Pendennis Castle in Cornwall. Although the invasion failed to materialise, he and his regiment remained in England until the war ended with the 1697 Peace of Ryswick.  

Re-elected for Fowey in August 1698, at the next election in January 1701 he stepped down in favour of his cousin John Granville. When the War of the Spanish Succession began in July, his regiment was posted to Flanders; Granville did not accompany it, having been appointed Governor of Barbados in May 1702, with a salary of £2,000 per annum. This meant he would have to relinquish Pendennis Castle, ownership of his regiment and his army rank, which led to a complex series of negotiations and delayed his departure until March 1703. In the end, he sold his regiment to William North, 6th Baron North in January, Marlborough approved his promotion to brigadier general and his brother George replaced him as Governor of Pendennis Castle.           

Accompanied by his youngest brother Bernard, Granville reached Barbados in June, but his time there was marked by poor health and struggles with the Parliament of Barbados. A colonial governorship provided many opportunities for personal enrichment and the settlers began complaining to Parliament of his "tyranny and extortion". Although "honourably acquitted" at a hearing on 20 July 1705, Granville asked Marlborough to approve his recall, which he did; on 15 September 1706, he died of fever on board the ship bringing him home.

Notes

References

Sources

 
 
 
 
 
 
 
 
 
 

|-

1665 births
1706 deaths
Alumni of Trinity College, Cambridge
Barbadian political people
17th-century English people
18th-century English people
Bevil
Knights Bachelor
Royal Lincolnshire Regiment officers
Governors of Barbados